The 2019 Kilkenny Senior Hurling League was the 26th staging of the Kilkenny Senior Hurling League since its establishment by the Kilkenny County Board in 1992. The league began on 6 April 2019 and ended on 22 September 2019.

James Stephens were the defending champions.

On 22 September 2019, Dicksboro won the league after a 2-15 to 2-14 defeat of O'Loughlin Gaels in the final. This was their fourth league title overall and their first tile since 2-17.

Results

Group A

Table

Results

Group B

Table

Results

Knock-out stage

Shield final

Final

League statistics

Top scorers

Top scorers overall

Top scorers in a single game

References

External link

 Kilkenny GAA website

Hurling competitions in Leinster
Hurling competitions in County Kilkenny